Aligh n'Targa ("down stream") is a village in the rural town of Toundoute, in Ouarzazate Province, Drâa-Tafilalet, Morocco.
Aligh n'Targa is located in the vicinity of Skoura, 50 km north of the city of Ouarzazate.

Populated places in Ouarzazate Province